The House of Manannan is a museum in Peel in the Isle of Man. It is named after the "great mythological sea god" Manannan and covers the island's Celtic, Viking, and Maritime history.

History 
The museum is located in the former Peel railway station. The original building was built in 1873 and closed in September 1968 with the closure of the Peel line between Douglas and Peel. In 1979 it was used to house Odin's Raven. In 1997 the building was then repurposed and expanded to suit the needs of the museum at a cost of £5.5 million.

Exhibitions 
The museum has several permanent exhibitions depicting the Celtic period of the Isle of Man to the modern era, such as a life size reconstruction of a Celtic roundhouse, as well as other attractions based from the 19th century, like a replication of a Peel street. Sea stories are also shared with visitors.

One of its most notable attractions is Odin's Raven, a recreation of a Viking longboat in two-thirds scale. Odin's Raven was made in Norway and then sailed to Peel, arriving on 4 July 1979 as part of the High Court of Tynwald's millennium celebrations.

Apart from the permanent exhibitions, several temporary themed exhibitions are shown in the exhibition gallery each year. Artists such Edward Kelly have had their work exhibited in the gallery. Other exhibitions have included This Is Christmas which focuses on the celebration of Christmas during the 1950s to 1970s on the Isle of Man.

Facilities 
The museum also has a gift shop and a café. There is limited parking behind the museum.

References

Museums in the Isle of Man
Peel, Isle of Man
Viking Age museums